Zhilyayev is a surname. Notable people with the surname include:

 Nikolai Zhilyayev (disambiguation), multiple people
 Yevgeniy Zhilyayev (born 1973), Kazakh water polo player

Russian-language surnames